Asturian Mountain (}}) is a local Spanish breed of cattle, which possess breeding capacity and docility. They are primarily raised in the east of Asturias, in the north of Spain, particularly in the mountain range of the Picos de Europa, including within the National Park of Covadonga.  The breed is also known as the Casina They are beef cattle and one of three breeds used to produce Casín cheese.

History

Breeding and farming
ASEAMO represents associated farmers in Asturias, Cantabria, the Basque Country, Castille-León, Madrid, and La Rioja, Spain.

Commercial output
Asturian Mountain (Casina) cattle meat has the protected designation Casín beef or meat, and the breed is one of three that may be used to produce Casín cheese.

See also 
 Asturian Valley

References

  (This site has been replaced with that of the re-formed ministry, Ministerio de Agricultura, Alimentación y Medio Ambiente.)
 

Cattle breeds originating in Spain
Cattle breeds
Asturias